Harun Rashid Khan (known as Harun Khan) is the Secretary General of the Muslim Council of Britain. The Muslim Council of Britain is a national umbrella body which currently serves more than 500 Muslim organisations and institutions in the UK. He was first elected to the position in 2016 and is the first British-born Secretary General of the organisation, and is the youngest person to be elected into the role. He was re-elected in 2018 as Secretary General, for a further 2-year term.

Early life 
Khan was born in Whitechapel, East London. His father emigrated from Bangladesh to East London in 1958 and worked in the garment trade and the restaurant industry. His mother was a seamstress.  He has three sisters.

Khan is married and has three daughters.

Education 
Khan attended Raine's Foundation School, a Church of England school in East London. He completed his A-Levels at Lime Grove College. He went on to study at the University of East London, completing a degree in Civil Engineering.

Career 
During his time at the University of East London, Khan worked as a trainee civil engineer at Tower Hamlets Council, studying for his degree part-time. He later worked at Transport for London, becoming a senior manager before joining the Muslim Council of Britain. Within the MCB, he has previously held the roles of Chair of the London Committee, Treasurer and Deputy Secretary General before being elected as Secretary General, initially in 2016.

References 

Year of birth missing (living people)
Living people
People from Whitechapel
Alumni of the University of East London
English people of Bangladeshi descent